, or the Gluttonous Detective 2, is a Japanese TV drama aired on Nippon TV from April 14, 2007, to June 23, 2007, at 21:00 on Saturdays. The sequel of the Japanese TV drama Kuitan aired in 2006. The TV series Kuitan and Kuitan 2 were inspired by the manga kuitan, but the episodes presented in the TV series are different from those in the original manga series.

Cast
Noriyuki Higashiyama as Seiya Takano, The Kuitan
Gō Morita as Ryōsuke Noda
Kotomi Kyōno as Momo Ogata
Mikako Ichikawa as Kyōko Idemizu
Kenta Suga as Hajime Kaneda
Shirō Sano as Detective Igarashi
Shirō Itō as Chief Yamauchi
Rina Koike as Rei Kinoshita

Guests
Kinako Kobayashi (episode 2)
Aki Maeda (episode 8)
Airi Taira (episode 8)
Akira Kubo (episode 10)
Seina Kasugai (episodes 10 and 11)

Episode list

External links
Official website

References

Japanese drama television series
Television shows written by Kazuhiko Ban
Nippon TV dramas
Television shows set in Yokohama